Lukas Fernandes (born February 26, 1998) is an American soccer player and coach who is currently an assistant with the Temple Owls men's soccer team.

Career

College
Fernandes played four years of college soccer at Temple University between 2016 and 2019, where he scored 10 goals and tallied 9 assists in 55 appearances for the Owls.

While at college, Fernandes played with Rochester Lancers in both the NPSL and the MASL.

Professional
Fernandes signed his first professional deal with USL Championship club Pittsburgh Riverhounds on December 19, 2019, ahead of their 2020 season. He made his professional debut on July 12, 2020, appearing as an injury time substitute during a 3–1 win over Louisville City FC. Fernandes scored his first professional goal on July 19, 2020 during a 6–0 win over Philadelphia Union II.

Fernandes was dropped by the Riverhounds after the 2020 season. He signed with the Rochester Lancers again in 2021.

Coaching
In July 2022, Fernandes left the Flower City Union to join the coaching staff at his alma mater, Temple University.

References

External links

 NISA profile

1998 births
Living people
American soccer players
Association football forwards
Temple Owls men's soccer players
Pittsburgh Riverhounds SC players
Soccer players from New York (state)
National Premier Soccer League players
USL Championship players
Sportspeople from Rochester, New York
National Independent Soccer Association players
Temple Owls men's soccer coaches